East Dean and United Parishes Rural District, later renamed East Dean Rural District, was a rural district in Gloucestershire, England from 1894 to 1974. It included a number of civil parishes, including East Dean, and was subject to a significant boundary reform in 1935.

It included the following civil parishes:

Abenhall (1894–1935); abolished as a civil parish to become part of Mitcheldean
Awre (1935–1974); previously an urban district
Blaisdon
Bulley (1894–1935); abolished as a civil parish to become part of Churcham
Churcham 
Cinderford (1953–1974); formed from part of East Dean civil parish
East Dean (1894–1953)
part split off in 1935 to form new parish of Lydbrook and transferred to West Dean Rural District
abolished as a civil parish in 1953 to create Cinderford, Drybrook and Ruspidge; parts to Awre, Littledean and Mitcheldean
Drybrook (1953–1974); formed from part of East Dean civil parish
Flaxley (1894–1935); abolished as a civil parish to become part of Blaisdon
Huntley
Littledean
Longhope
Mitcheldean
Minsterworth (1894–1953); transferred to Gloucester Rural District
Ruardean
Ruspidge (1953–1974); formed from part of East Dean civil parish

The district was abolished in 1974 when its former area became part of the Forest of Dean district, under the Local Government Act 1972.

References

Districts of England abolished by the Local Government Act 1972
Rural districts of England
Districts of England created by the Local Government Act 1894